William Edward Phillipson (3 December 1910 – 25 August 1991) was an English first-class cricketer who was born in Cheshire. He played for Lancashire County Cricket Club for 15 years before becoming a Test cricket umpire.

References

External links

1910 births
1991 deaths
English cricketers
Lancashire cricketers
English Test cricket umpires
Northumberland cricketers
North v South cricketers
English cricketers of 1919 to 1945